Roy McDonald may refer to:

 Roy McDonald (footballer) (1896–1970), Welsh footballer
 Roy McDonald (poet) (1937–2018), Canadian poet and busker
 Roy J. McDonald (born 1947), New York state senator
 Roy McDonald, drummer for rock bands The Muffs, Redd Kross and formerly of The Things